Greenacres can refer to:

Greenacres, California, a town in the Central Valley (United States)
'Greenacres', the legendary 1920s Harold Lloyd Estate in Beverly Hills, California (United States)
Greenacres, Florida, town in the United States
Greenacres, Washington, a neighborhood in the city of Spokane Valley in the United States
Greenacres, South Australia, town in Australia
Greenacres, neighbourhood of Motherwell, Scotland
Greenacres, Greater Manchester, (also known as "Greenacres Moor") in Oldham, United Kingdom
Greenacres Caravan Park, Gypsy Lane, Little Billington, near Leighton Buzzard, Bedfordshire, England: the scene of a major police operation on Sunday 11 September 2011
Greenacres Foundation, the estate of Louis and Louise Nippert near Cincinnati, Ohio.

See also
Green Acres (disambiguation)